Andrew Lachlan McCann is an Australian academic and writer of horror fiction.

Biography
McCann lives in Victoria and holds both an MA from the University of Melbourne and a PhD from Cornell University. His academic work has won him awards and fellowships. McCann has also published works in topics such as politics and history. He is a lecturer at the Melbourne University's English Department. McCann's first novel, The White Body of Evening was published in 2002 by HarperCollins. It won the 2002 Aurealis Award for best horror novel. His second novel was released in 2005, entitled Subtopia, and was published by Vulgar Press.

As a Sydney Review of Books contributor, McCann's subjects have ranged from Otto Dov Kulka to David Woodard.

Bibliography
The White Body of Evening (2002)
Subtopia (2005)

References

External links
A. L. McCann at HarperCollins

1966 births
21st-century Australian novelists
Australian academics
Australian horror writers
Australian male novelists
Living people
21st-century Australian male writers
Dartmouth College faculty